Street Sounds Electro 10 is the tenth compilation album in a series and was released 1985 on the StreetSounds label. The album was released on LP and cassette and contains eight electro music and old-school hip hop tracks mixed by Herbie Laidley.

Track listing

References

External links
 Street Sounds Electro 10 at Discogs

1985 compilation albums
Hip hop compilation albums
Electro compilation albums